Afternoon of a Georgia Faun is an album by American jazz saxophonist Marion Brown recorded in 1970 and released on the ECM label. Along with Geechee Recollections and Sweet Earth Flying, it was one of Brown's albums dedicated to the US state of Georgia. The album features Brown, multi-instrumentalists Anthony Braxton and Bennie Maupin, vocalists Jeanne Lee and Gayle Palmore, pianist Chick Corea, and percussionists Andrew Cyrille and Jack Gregg, all of whom double on secondary instruments, along with three supplementary percussionists for the second track.

In an interview regarding the recording, Brown stated that the sound world of the album was related to "things that I saw and heard each day going from my house to school, church, visiting, roaming with my dog and a BB gun looking for birds to shoot... It was also... the things my ears enjoyed: birds singing outside my window, dogs barking, a rooster crowing in the morning, crickets in the summer, the sound of people having a good time in one of the houses where those good times are had, standing outside the sanctified church at night enjoying music, and the sound of happy feet stamping furiously, in tune with the preacher and themselves."

Concerning the recording session, Chick Corea recalled: "There was so much respect for one another in the studio that... as soon as the first sounds began and we knew we were recording, everyone was in it and totally listening to one another — listening to the sounds that the others were making and always putting something in that complimented the other sound or contrasted the other sound one way or the other... That was the vibe, and it was very thick and very pleasurable." Andrew Cyrille reflected: "I don’t remember Marion saying, 'Stop. No. Do this, do that.' He just accepted what was going on... He just asked us to go ahead and play, and that's what we did...Everybody was kind of focused on him spiritually."

Reception

In a review for AllMusic, Brian Olewnick awarded the album 4 stars, and stated: "the title track... is a wonderful, percussive evocation of pastoral Georgia, something along the lines of what the Art Ensemble of Chicago were doing around the same time, but without the satire and with a greater sense of serenity. As the flutes, reeds, voice, and piano enter, there is no idea of 'soloing'; instead, each contributes to the ongoing, evolving texture of the piece, creating a fabric that's as cohesive as it is unplanned. The remaining cut, 'Djinji's Corner,' is a bit more fleshed out, a little more 'traditional' in one way, though still quite unusual for the time. Again, a reference point might be Art Ensemble works from around the same time, here a mélange of free horns and intense percussion, with Jeanne Lee soaring over the top, mixing words and glossolalia... The effect is more eerie and spiritually infused than the preceding piece, with keening, bowed cymbals and deep pulses from the lower clarinet family. It gradually builds to something of a frenzy, but in an unforced manner that shows it to be merely another approach to the territory explored earlier. Afternoon of a Georgia Faun is a lovely, inspired album, a key work in Marion Brown's oeuvre and a recording that belongs in any collection of contemporary jazz."

Writing for All About Jazz, Nic Jones commented: "Brown's music had become something which quietly demanded that its players also be virtuoso listeners. The presence of the likes of saxophonist Anthony Braxton and drummer Andrew Cyrille ensures that this isn't a problem, while Chick Corea commits to posterity some of the most extraordinary work he's ever put on record. Despite this—or, indeed, perhaps because of it—the degree to which Brown was now preoccupied with his 'Own Thing' as opposed to the 'New Thing' could not be more pronounced."

Robert Palmer, in an article for The New York Times, wrote: "Brown initiated the music with minimal guidelines and the language which emerged — brief, condensed, overlapping statements, constantly changing textures as a kind of light/shade metaphor—parallels that of certain contemporary European compositions, Boulez's 'Le Marteau sans Maitre' for example... Of the two performances included, the title piece is the most successful. Wooden percussion instruments are employed by, all the participants and voices and various reeds gradually complicate their raindrop sounds. On 'Djinji's Corner' Brown uses several 'assistants,' whom he describes as 'not actually musicians, but people who have a sense of rhythm and melody,' and introduces the concept of station improvisation, in which the instruments are collected at several 'stations' in the studio and the players move from station to station, so that a phrase begun, on a horn may be finished on a percussion toy. There is a brief flurry of overblown saxophones and thrashing drums near the end, the only occurrence of this characteristic sound of freely improvised jazz..."

Writing for Between Sound and Space, Tyran Grillo stated: "Over 35 minutes we are treated to a distilled experience that jumps, flies, and slithers its way through a forest of sounds... The music is indeterminate and uncompromising and unleashes its full torrent only in the second movement, 'Djinji’s Corner.' Slide whistles, snares, and bass join in the cacophony... one begins to hear inklings of the space for which ECM would soon come to be known. It is also meticulously recorded. Every detail comes through... Describing the sound of this album is, I imagine, as difficult as it was to lay it down in the studio. The sheer range of implied space is impressive, made all the more so for its organic textures. A masterpiece of free jazz and well worth the chance for the adventurous listener."

In an article for The Bitter Southerner, Jon Ross wrote: "The title track on Georgia Faun is not about the notes played or the facility of each performer; Brown didn't even pick up his saxophone during the 17-minute tune, but the ideas, the organization, and the feeling are his own. In fact, nearly all of the musicians on the record stayed away from their primary instruments. Brown played a zomari, a Tanzanian double reed instrument, and various forms of percussion; saxophonists Anthony Braxton and Bennie Maupin can be heard on wooden flutes, evoking birds and woodland life. The emotive quality of the sounds is paramount. Brown hewed to this concept throughout the trio of records... Georgia Faun is a sound of recollection mixed with ancestral lineage. It's not nostalgia or a longing for 1930s Atlanta, but a re-creation of the feeling of the South."

Saxophonist Henry Kuntz called the album "truly historic", and praised "Djinji's Corner", writing: "In its superb balance between individual and collective elements, 'Djinji's Corner' stands as something of a culmination of the direction in which free music had been moving in the Sixties; in that, it stands alongside Free Jazz, Ascension, and New York Eye and Ear Control as a landmark (the most fully realized aesthetically) of free group improvisation. ('Djinji's Corner' might likewise be said to keynote the direction much of the music would take in the Seventies – the path of spontaneous free improvisation – its explicit structural necessities now becoming more shared and intuitive.)"

Author Bob Gluck suggested that Afternoon of a Georgia Faun was an influence on the group Circle, which featured both Corea and Braxton, as the recording took place shortly before Circle's first recording sessions on August 13, 19, and 21, 1970. Gluck wrote: "Calm and filled with evocative sense impressions, 'Georgia Faun' the tune shows Brown employing instruments and textural improvisations associated with the AACM. Braxton was thus an excellent choice to participate. For Corea, the recording was an opportunity to explore sonic possibilities in new ways, in tandem with Braxton as his new musical partner... Overall, the music is lush and evocative, presented with conviction by musicians sensitive to the nuance of open improvisation. The spare, textural qualities of the improvisation reflect the kind of heightened mutuality and sensitivity to sonic and gestural nuance characteristic of Circle in its finest moments."

Track listing
All compositions by Marion Brown
 "Afternoon of a Georgia Faun" - 17:01 
 "Djinji's Corner" - 18:03
Recorded at Sound Ideas Studio in New York City on August 10, 1970.

Personnel
 Marion Brown — alto saxophone, zomari, percussion 
 Anthony Braxton — alto saxophone, soprano saxophone, clarinet, contrabass clarinet, musette, flute, percussion
 Bennie Maupin — tenor saxophone, alto flute, bass clarinet, acorn, bells, wood flute, percussion
 Jeanne Lee — vocals, percussion
Gayle Palmore — vocals, piano, percussion
 Chick Corea — piano, bells, gong, percussion
 Jack Gregg — bass, percussion
 Andrew Cyrille — percussion
 Larry Curtis — percussion (track 2)
 William Green — percussion (track 2)
 Billy Malone — African drums (track 2)

References

ECM Records albums
Marion Brown albums
1970 albums
Albums produced by Manfred Eicher